Amomyrtus luma, known as luma, is a species of tree in the family Myrtaceae. It is native to Chile and Argentina.  It grows from Colchagua to Aysen (34 to 45°S). This species occurs in rainforests, near streams, and in other moist sites.

Description
Luma is an evergreen tree that measures up to 25 m (80 ft) tall and up to 50 cm (25 in) in diameter, with smooth bark, decorticant, reddish to brown. The leaves are opposite, in an oval to oblong shape, with an acute apex that ends in a pointed end up to 1 mm long. The petioles are hairy, 2–4 mm long. New shoots are hairy, which distinguishes it from Amomyrtus meli, a species that it strongly resembles. The flowers are hermaphroditic, with 5 fused sepals and 5 free white petals about 4 mm long. The stamens are numerous (30-45) and 4–5 mm long. The fruit is a black to purplish-black berry when mature, 1-1.5 cm in diameter, generally with 3 seeds, about 3-4.5 mm.

Uses
The fruits, which are called "cauchaos," are edible and used to make marmalade. The wood is extremely hard and resistant and is used as firewood. It has been planted in Spain.

Etymology
The name Amomyrtus comes from the Greek Amos (fragrant) and the family name Myrtus, and Luma is the Mapuche name for the tree.

References

External links

Myrtaceae
Trees of Chile
Trees of mild maritime climate